Vedic Extensions is a Unicode block containing characters for representing tones and other vedic symbols in Devanagari and other Indic scripts. Related symbols (also used in many scripts to represent vedic accents) are defined in two other blocks: Devanagari (U+0900–U+097F) and Devanagari Extended (U+A8E0–U+A8FF).

Block

History
The following Unicode-related documents record the purpose and process of defining specific characters in the Vedic Extensions block:

See also 
Devanagari in Unicode

References 

Unicode blocks